Argopecten eboreus yorkensis is a fossil scallop, an extinct subspecies of marine bivalve mollusks in the family Pectinidae, the scallops.

References

Pectinidae
eboreus yorkensis